El mar y el tiempo (English: The Sea and the Weather) is a 1989 drama film written and directed by Fernando Fernán Gómez.

Cast
Rafaela Aparicio as Abuela
José Soriano as Jesús
Fernando Fernán Gómez as Eusebio
Aitana Sánchez-Gijón as Mer
Iñaki Miramón as Anselmo
Ramon Madaula as Mariano
Fernando Guillén Cuervo as Pepe
Gabino Diego as Basilio
María Asquerino as Marcela

Awards and nominations

Won
Goya Awards
Best Actress (Rafaela Aparicio)
Best Supporting Actress (María Asquerino)

Nominated
Goya Awards
Best Actor (Fernando Fernán Gómez)
Best Director (Fernando Fernán Gómez)
Best Editing (Pablo González del Amo)
Best Film
Best Makeup and Hairstyles
Best Production Supervision
Best Screenplay – Adapted (Fernando Fernán Gómez)
Best Sound

1989 films
Spanish drama films
1980s Spanish-language films
1989 drama films
Films directed by Fernando Fernán Gómez
1980s Spanish films